A housing estate (or sometimes housing complex or housing development) is a group of homes and other buildings built together as a single development. The exact form may vary from country to country. 

Popular throughout the United States and the United Kingdom, they are often areas of high-density, low-impact residences of single-family detached homes and often allow for separate ownership of each housing unit, for example through subdivision.

In major Asian cities, such as Hong Kong, Kuala Lumpur, Shanghai, Shenzhen, Singapore, Seoul, Taipei, and Tokyo, an estate may range from detached houses to high-density tower blocks with or without commercial facilities; in Europe and America, these may take the form of town housing, high-rise housing projects, or the older-style rows of terraced houses associated with the Industrial Revolution, detached or semi-detached houses with small plots of land around them forming gardens, and are frequently without commercial facilities and such.

In Central and Eastern Europe, living in housing estates is a common way of living. Most of these housing estates originated during the communist era because the construction of large housing estates was an important part of building plans in communist countries in Europe. They can be located in suburban and urban areas.

Accordingly, a housing estate is usually built by a single contractor, with only a few styles of house or building design, so they tend to be uniform in appearance. 

A housing development is "often erected on a tract of land by one builder and controlled by one management." In the United Kingdom, the term is quite broad and can include anything from high-rise government-subsidised housing right through to more upmarket, developer-led suburban tract housing. Such estates are usually designed to minimise through-traffic flows and provide recreational space in the form of parks and greens.

Etymology
The use of the term may have arisen from an area of housing being built on what had been a country estate as towns and cities expanded in and after the 19th century. It was in use by 1901.
Reduction of the phrase to mere "estate" is common in the United Kingdom and Ireland (especially when preceded by the specific estate name), but not in the United States.

Housing types 
There are several different housing types utilized by housing developers. Each of the different housing types will have their distinctive characteristics, density ranges, number of units, and floors.
Single Detached: This type of housing will be detached from other housing types. This type of unit houses lower densities. Lawns are an option for this kind of design, with distinctive public and private spaces. A single detached can have up to three floors.
Commonly referred to as: House, Cottage, Villa, or Bungalow.
Duplex, Triplex: This type of housing can have two or three dwelling units in a detached building. The units could be together or separate depending on the location of the duplex. A duplex will also have an option for a yard in order to keep their private space. This type of housing will allow for higher density housing compared to the single detached units. Duplex, and Triplex can account for 2-3 units, and have up to 3 floors.
Commonly referred to as:  Semi-detached, Double House, Accessory unity, Ancillary unit, Carriage unit, or Twin Home.
Big house, Multiplex: Big house, Multiplex can come in many forms, it can have a single or muli-level unit. Just like the duplex, it can have multiple floors, up to 3 floors. It can account for up to 5 units as well. This type of housing will have a higher density than single detached housing.
Commonly referred to as: Quadruplex, Mansion townhomes, back to back semi-detached, or Grand house.
Other types: Side Attached, Stacked Rowhouse, Small Apartment, Low-rise Apartment, Mid-rise Apartment, Apartment over Commercial, High-Rise Apartment.

Asia

Hong Kong

Due to dense population and government control of land use, the most common form of residential housing in Hong Kong is the high-rise housing estate, which may be publicly owned, privately owned, or semi-private. Due to the oligopoly of real-estate developers in the territory, and the economies of scale of mass developments, there is the tendency of new private tower block developments with 10 to over 100 towers, ranging from 30 to 70 stories high.

Public housing provides affordable homes for those on low incomes, with rents which are heavily subsidised, financed by financial activities such as rents and charges collected from car parks and shops within or near the estates. They may vary in scale, and are usually located in the remote or less accessible parts of the territory, but urban expansion has put some of them in the heart of the urban area. Although some units are destined exclusively for rental, some of the flats within each development are earmarked for sale at prices that are lower than for private developments.

Private housing estates are usually characterised by a cluster of high-rise buildings, often with a shopping centre or market of its own in the case of larger developments. Mei Foo Sun Chuen, built by Mobil, is the earliest (1965) and largest (99 blocks) example of its kind. Since the mid-1990s, private developers have been incorporating leisure facilities, including clubhouse facilities, namely swimming pools, tennis courts, and function rooms in their more up-market developments. The most recent examples would also be equipped with cinemas, dance studios, cigar-rooms.

There is currently some controversy over the "wall effect" caused by uniform high-rise developments, which adversely affect air circulation. In-fill developments will tend to be done by smaller developers with less capital. These will be smaller in scale, and less prone to the wall effect.

Pakistan
Given the security situation and power shortages in South Asia, 'gated communities' with self-generated energy and modern amenities (24-hour armed security, schools, hospitals, a fire department, retail shopping, restaurants and entertainment centres ) such as Bahria Town and DHA have been developed in all major Pakistani cities. Bahria Town is the largest private housing society in Asia. Bahria has been featured by international magazines and news agencies such as GlobalPost, Newsweek, Los Angeles Times and Emirates 24/7, referred to as the prosperous face of Pakistan. Gated communities in Pakistan are targeted towards upper middle class and upper class, and are mostly immune from problems of law enforcement.

Europe

Czech Republic and Slovakia

Forms of housing estates may vary in Czech Republic  and Slovakia. In the former Czechoslovakia (now Czech Republic and Slovakia) during the communist era, a construction of large housing estates was an important part of building plans. The government wanted to provide large quantities of fast and affordable housing and to slash costs by employing uniform designs over the whole country. They also sought to foster a "collectivist nature" in people. People living in these housing estates can either usually own their apartments or rent them, usually through a private landlord. There's usually a mix of social classes in these housing estates.

Most buildings in Czech and Slovak housing estates are so called "paneláks", a colloquial term in Czech and Slovak for a panel building constructed of pre-fabricated, pre-stressed concrete, such as those extant in the Czech Republic, Slovakia and elsewhere in the world. Large housing estates of concrete panel buildings (paneláks) now dominate the streets of Prague, Bratislava and other towns. The largest housing estate in Central Europe and Slovakia can be found in Petržalka (population about 130,000), a part of the Slovak capital of Bratislava.

United Kingdom and Republic of Ireland

In the United Kingdom and the Republic of Ireland, housing estates have become prevalent since the Second World War, as a more affluent population demanded larger and more widely spaced houses coupled with the increase of car usage for which terraced streets were unsuitable.

Housing estates were produced by either local authorities (more recently, housing associations) or by private developers. The former tended to be a means of producing public housing leading to monotenure estates full of council houses often known as "council estates". The latter can refer to higher end tract housing for the middle class and even upper middle class.

The problems incurred by the early attempts at high density tower-block housing turned people away from this style of living. The resulting demand for land has seen many towns and cities increase in size for relatively moderate increases in population. This has been largely at the expense of rural and greenfield land.  Recently, there has been some effort to address this problem by banning the development of out-of-town commercial developments and encouraging the reuse of brownfield or previously developed sites for residential building. Nevertheless, the demand for housing continues to rise, and in the UK at least has precipitated a significant housing crisis.

North America

United States
Forms of housing estates in the United States include tract housing, apartment complexes, and public housing.

Image gallery

See also
 Bahria Town
 Danchi (Japan)
 Ghost estate (Ireland)
 Khrushchyovka (Former Soviet Union)
 Panelák and Sídlisko (Czech Republic and Slovakia)
 Panelház (Hungary)
 Plattenbau (Germany)
 HLM (France)
 Million Programme (Sweden)
 Public housing
 Affordable housing
 Subsidized housing
 Subsidized housing in the United States
 Section 8 (United States)
 Residential area
 Subdivision (land)
 Tract housing
 Social welfare
 Welfare state

References

Human habitats